Shirley Strum Kenny (born 1934) is an English scholar and retired university president. Kenny was the fourth president of Stony Brook University from 1994 until the end of the 2008-2009 academic year. She was the first woman to hold that position. She had served as the president of Queens College from 1985 to 1994. In 2012, Kenny served as the interim president of Augusta State University upon the retirement of its long time president William A. Bloodworth from July 1 until the position was eliminated on December 31, 2012 as a result of Augusta State University's merger with Georgia Health Sciences University on August 10 of the same year.

Life and achievements
Kenny grew up in Tyler, Texas.  She holds a bachelor's degree in English and journalism from the University of Texas-Dallas, an M.A. from the University of Minnesota, a Ph.D. from the University of Chicago, and honorary doctorates from the University of Rochester, and Chonnam National, Dongguk, and Ajou Universities in South Korea. She has taught at the University of Texas, Gallaudet University,  The Catholic University of America, the University of Delaware and the University of Maryland. At Maryland, she was successively chair of the Department of English and provost of the College of Arts and Humanities.

Kenny has published five books and numerous articles in the field of Restoration and eighteenth-century British drama. Her two-volume scholarly edition of the dramatic works of George Farquhar was published by Oxford University Press.

Kenny sits on the boards of directors of numerous corporations. She is married to Dr. Robert W. Kenny, and they have five children and four grandchildren.

References

External links 
 Shirley Strum Kenny Arts Festival

Presidents of Stony Brook University
University of Minnesota alumni
1935 births
Living people
University of Chicago alumni
Gallaudet University faculty
Catholic University of America faculty
Presidents of Queens College, City University of New York